In computing, w32tm is a command-line tool of Microsoft Windows operating systems used to diagnose problems occurring with time setting or to troubleshoot any problems that might occur during or after the configuration of the Windows Time service. It was introduced as a standard feature of Windows XP.

The command can be used to convert an NTTE or NTP formatted date into a readable format.

Example
The current time zone settings can be displayed using the  parameter:

>w32tm /tz

See also
 DATE (command)
 TIME (command)

References

Further reading

External links

Windows Time Service Tools and Settings | Microsoft Docs